CBAX-FM is a Canadian radio station, which broadcasts Radio-Canada's Ici Musique network at 91.5 FM in Halifax, Nova Scotia. It was launched in 2002. CBAX's studios are located on Chebucto Road in Halifax, while its transmitter is located on Washmill Lake Drive in Clayton Park.

Transmitters
The CBC also received approval to add transmitters in the following communities:

1In the 1980s, the 101.9 frequency was assigned to the CKO network, which folded in 1989 before the St. John's station had a chance to open.

References

External links
 ICI Musique
 
 

BAX
BAX
BAX
BAX
BAX
Radio stations established in 2002
2002 establishments in Nova Scotia